Cleavon Jake Little (June 1, 1939 – October 22, 1992) was an American stage, film, and television actor. He began his career in the late 1960s on the stage. In 1970, he starred in the Broadway production of Purlie, for which he earned both a Tony Award and a Drama Desk Award. His first leading television role was that of the irreverent Dr. Jerry Noland on the ABC sitcom Temperatures Rising (1972–1974). While starring in the sitcom, Little appeared in what has become his signature performance, portraying Sheriff Bart in the 1974 Mel Brooks comedy film Blazing Saddles.

In the 1980s, Little continued to appear in stage productions, films, and in guest spots on television series. In 1989, he won a Primetime Emmy Award for his appearance on the NBC sitcom Dear John. He later starred on the Fox sitcom True Colors (1991–1992).

Early life
Little was born in Chickasha, Oklahoma, the son of Malchi Little and DeEtta Jones Little. He was the brother of singer DeEtta Little West, best known for her performance (with Nelson Pigford) of the vocals on the chart-topping Bill Conti song "Gonna Fly Now," the main theme to Rocky. He had another sister, Rosemarie Little Martin, and two brothers, Everett and Roy. 

Little was raised in San Diego, California, and attended Kearny High School, graduating in 1957. He graduated from San Diego State College in 1965 with a degree in speech therapy and appeared in A Raisin in the Sun in 1962 at the Old Globe Theatre in San Diego. He worked his way through college as a janitor and gave Black poetry presentations to clubs and groups. He won a scholarship from the American Broadcasting Company to attend the American Academy of Dramatic Arts in New York City and was named the best actor in the class of 1967.

Career

Little made his professional debut in February 1967, appearing off-Broadway at the Village Gate as the Muslim Witch in the original production of Barbara Garson's MacBird. This was followed by the role of Foxtrot in the original production of Bruce Jay Friedman's long-running play Scuba Duba which premiered in October 1967. While portraying Foxtrot at night, he portrayed Hamlet during the days at schools and parks on behalf of the New York Shakespeare Festival.

The following year, he made his first film appearance in a small uncredited role in What's So Bad About Feeling Good? (1968), and his first television appearance as a guest star on two episodes of Felony Squad. A series of small roles followed in films such as John and Mary (1969) and Cotton Comes to Harlem (1970).

Little made his Broadway debut in 1969 as Lee Haines in John Sebastian and Murray Schisgal's musical Jimmy Shine with Dustin Hoffman in the title role. In 1970, he returned to Broadway to portray the title role in Ossie Davis's musical Purlie, for which he won the Tony Award for Best Actor in a Musical and the Drama Desk Award for Outstanding Actor in a Musical.

A year later, Little was hired as an ensemble player on the syndicated TV variety weekly The David Frost Revue and he portrayed Shogo in Narrow Road to the Deep North on Broadway. In 1971, Little was chosen to portray the blind radio personality Super Soul in the car-chase movie Vanishing Point. The same year, he played Hawthorne Dooley in the pilot for The Waltons called "The Homecoming: A Christmas Story," helping John-Boy Walton search for his father; then appeared again in season four, in an episode called "The Fighter," about a prizefighter who desires to build a church and be a preacher. He also played a burglar in a 1971 episode of All in the Family titled "Edith Writes a Song."

He then starred on the ABC sitcom Temperatures Rising, which aired in three different iterations from 1972 to 1974, with Little's character of Dr. Jerry Noland as the only common element. In 1974, he starred in the television disaster film The Day the Earth Moved, opposite Jackie Cooper and Stella Stevens. Little made a minor appearance in the Six Million Dollar Man episode, "Population: Zero", as one of the NASA deliveryman handing Colonel Steve Austin his space suit.

In 1974 he was cast as Sheriff Bart in Brooks' comedy western Blazing Saddles (1974), after the studio rejected Richard Pryor, who co-wrote the script. Studio executives were apparently concerned about Pryor's reliability, given his reputation for drug use and unpredictable behavior, and thought Little would be a safer choice. This role earned him a nomination for the BAFTA Award for Most Promising Newcomer to Leading Film Roles.

In 1975, Little returned to Broadway to portray the role of Lewis in the original production of Murray Schisgal's All Over Town under the direction of Dustin Hoffman. The following year, he appeared as Willy Stepp in the original production of Ronald Ribman's The Poison Tree at the Ambassador Theatre.

Over the years he made guest appearances on The Mod Squad, All in the Family, The Rookies, Police Story, The Rockford Files, The Love Boat, Fantasy Island, ABC Afterschool Specials, The Fall Guy, MacGyver, and a special Christmas episode of ALF.

Later career
Little played a supporting role to Pryor in the racing movie Greased Lightning (1977), based on the true life story of Wendell Scott, the first black stock car racing winner in America. Other films included FM (1978), Scavenger Hunt (1979), The Salamander (1981), High Risk (1981), Jimmy the Kid (1982), Surf II (1984), Toy Soldiers (1984), Once Bitten (1985), The Gig (1985) and Fletch Lives (1989).

Little returned to the New York stage in 1981 in the off-Broadway production The Resurrection of Lady Lester, a "poetic mood song" by OyamO, playing the legendary jazz saxophonist Lester Young.

In December 1985, Little opened at Broadway's Booth Theatre as Midge in Herb Gardner's play I'm Not Rappaport with Judd Hirsch, who won the Tony Award for Best Actor in a Play. Little had originated the role of Midge in the Seattle Repertory Theatre production.

In 1989 he appeared as a closeted gay man in Hirsch's sitcom Dear John in the episode "Stand by Your Man," for which Little won the Primetime Emmy Award for Outstanding Guest Actor in a Comedy Series, defeating Robert Picardo, Jack Gilford, Leslie Nielsen, and Sammy Davis Jr.

Little was slated to star on the television series Mr. Dugan, where he was to play a black congressman, but that series was poorly received  by real black congressmen  and was cancelled before making it to air. In 1991, he replaced Frankie Faison as Ronald Freeman, a black dentist married to a white housewife, on the Fox sitcom True Colors. The same year, he also had a supporting role on the television series Bagdad Cafe, appearing in 12 episodes. Later that year, he was cast as a civil-rights lawyer in the docudrama, Separate but Equal, starring Sidney Poitier, who portrayed the first black U.S. Supreme Court Justice, Thurgood Marshall, NAACP lead attorney in the 1954 Supreme Court case that desegregated public schools. He also appeared in the television series MacGyver as Frank Colton, one half of a bounty hunter brother duo.

Little's last appearance as an actor was in a guest role on a 1992 episode of the television series Tales from the Crypt entitled "This'll Kill Ya". Eleven years after his death, he appeared in the music video for "Show Me How to Live" by Audioslave, through archive footage from Vanishing Point.

Death and legacy
Little died of colon cancer at his home in the Sherman Oaks area of Los Angeles on October 22, 1992.

For Little's contribution to motion pictures, he was posthumously honored with a star on the Hollywood Walk of Fame on February 1, 1994. The star is located on the south side of Hollywood Boulevard near El Cerrito Place.

The Cleavon Little Scholarship, which provides assistance to minority students, was created at the American Academy of Dramatic Arts through a campaign led by Little's fellow alumnus and co-star Judd Hirsch.

His marriage to Valerie Wiggins ended in divorce. His daughter is Adia Millett.

Filmography

Theater
Purlie, Broadway play. (1970)
All Over Town, Broadway play. (1974)
I'm Not Rappaport, Broadway play. (1985)

References

External links

 
 
 
 
 

1939 births
1992 deaths
20th-century American male actors
American Academy of Dramatic Arts alumni
African-American male actors
American male musical theatre actors
American male film actors
American male stage actors
American male television actors
Deaths from cancer in California
Deaths from colorectal cancer
Drama Desk Award winners
Juilliard School alumni
Male actors from Oklahoma
Male actors from San Diego
People from Chickasha, Oklahoma
Primetime Emmy Award winners
Tony Award winners
San Diego State University alumni
20th-century American singers
American male comedy actors
20th-century American male singers
20th-century African-American male singers
Kearny High School (California) alumni